The usage share of web browsers is the portion, often expressed as a percentage, of visitors to a group of web sites that use a particular web browser.

Accuracy 

Measuring browser usage in the number of requests (page hits) made by each user agent can be misleading.

Overestimation 
Not all requests are generated by a user, as a user agent can make requests at regular time intervals without user input. In this case, the user's activity might be overestimated. Some examples:

 Certain anti-virus products fake their user agent string to appear to be popular browsers. This is done to trick attack sites that might display clean content to the scanner, but not to the browser. The Register reported in June 2008 that traffic from AVG Linkscanner, using an IE6 user agent string, outstripped human link clicks by nearly 10 to 1.
 A user who revisits a site shortly after changing or upgrading browsers may be double-counted under some methods; overall numbers at the time of a new version's release may be skewed.
 Occasionally websites are written in such a way that they effectively block certain browsers.  One common reason for this is that the website has been tested to work with only a limited number of browsers, and so the site owners enforce that only tested browsers are allowed to view the content, while all other browsers are sent a "failure" message, and instruction to use another browser. Many of the untested browsers may still be otherwise capable of rendering the content.  Sophisticated users who are aware of this may then "spoof" the user agent string in order to gain access to the site.
 Firefox, Chrome, Safari, and Opera will, under some circumstances, fetch resources before they need to render them, so that the resources can be used faster if they are needed. This technique, prerendering or pre-loading, may inflate the statistics for the browsers using it because of pre-loading of resources which are not used in the end.

Underestimation 
It is also possible to underestimate the usage share by using the number of requests, for example:

 Firefox 1.5 (and other Gecko-based browsers) and later versions use fast Document Object Model (DOM) caching. JavaScript is executed on page load only from net or disk cache, but not if it is loaded from DOM cache. This can affect JavaScript-based tracking of browser statistics.
 While most browsers generate additional page hits by refreshing web pages when the user navigates back through page history, some browsers (such as Opera) reuse cached content without resending requests to the server.
 Generally, the more faithfully a browser implements HTTP's cache specifications, the more it will be under-reported relative to browsers that implement those specifications poorly.
 Browser users may run site, cookie and JavaScript blockers which cause those users to be under-counted.  For example, common AdBlock blocklists such as EasyBlock include sites such as StatCounter in their privacy lists, and NoScript blocks all JavaScript by default. The Firefox Add-ons website reports 15.0 million users of AdBlock variants and 2.2 million users of NoScript.
 Users behind a caching proxy (e.g. Squid) may have repeat requests for certain pages served to the browser from the cache, rather than retrieving it again via the Internet.

User agent spoofing 
Websites often include code to detect browser version to adjust the page design sent according to the user agent string received. This may mean that less popular browsers are not sent complex content (even though they might be able to deal with it correctly) or, in extreme cases, refused all content. Thus, various browsers have a feature to cloak or spoof their identification to force certain server-side content.

 Default user agent strings of most browsers have pieces of strings from one or more other browsers, so that if the browser is unknown to a website, it can be identified as one of those. For example, Safari has not only "Mozilla/5.0", but also "KHTML" (from which Safari's WebKit was forked) and "Gecko" (the engine of Firefox).
 Some Linux browsers such as GNOME Web identify themselves as Safari in order to aid compatibility.

Differences in measurement 
Net Applications, in their NetMarketShare report, uses unique visitors to measure web usage. The effect is that users visiting a site ten times will only be counted once by these sources, while they are counted ten times by statistics companies that measure page hits.

Net Applications uses country-level weighting as well. The goal of weighting countries based on their usage is to mitigate selection area based sampling bias. This bias is caused by the differences in the percentage of tracked hits in the sample, and the percentage of global usage tracked by third party sources. This difference is caused by the heavier levels of market usage.

Statistics from the United States government's Digital Analytics Program (DAP) do not represent world-wide usage patterns. DAP uses raw data from a unified Google Analytics account.

Summary tables 

The following tables summarize the usage share of all browsers for the indicated months.

Crossover to smartphones having majority share 

According to StatCounter web use statistics (a proxy for all use), in the week from 7–13 November 2016, "mobile" (meaning smartphones) alone (without tablets) overtook desktop for the first time and by the end of the year smartphones were in the majority. Since 27 October, the desktop has not shown a majority, even on weekdays.

The two biggest continents, Asia and Africa, have been mobile-majority for a while, and Australia is by now desktop-minority too. A few countries in Europe and South America have also followed this trend of being mobile-majority.

In March 2015, for the first time in the US the number of mobile-only adult internet users exceeded the number of desktop-only internet users with 11.6% of the digital population only using mobile compared to 10.6% only using desktop; this also means the majority, 78%, use both desktop and mobile to access the internet.

Older reports (2000–2019)

StatCounter (Jan 2009 to October 2019) 

StatCounter statistics are directly derived from hits (not unique visitors) from 3 million sites using StatCounter totaling more than 15 billion hits per month. No weightings are used.

W3Counter (May 2007 to December 2022) 
This site counts the last 15,000 page views from each of approximately 80,000 websites.
This limits the influence of sites with more than 15,000 monthly visitors on the usage statistics.
W3Counter is not affiliated with the World Wide Web Consortium (W3C).

Net Applications (May 2016 to November 2019) 

Net Applications bases its usage share on statistics from 40,000 websites having around 160 million unique visitors per month. The mean site has 1300 unique visitors per day.

Wikimedia (April 2009 to March 2015) 

Wikimedia traffic analysis reports are based on server logs of about 4 billion page requests per month, based on the user agent information that accompanied the requests. These server logs cover requests to all the Wikimedia Foundation projects, including Wikipedia, Wikimedia Commons, Wiktionary, Wikibooks, Wikiquote, Wikisource, Wikinews, Wikiversity and others.

Note: Wikimedia has recently had a large percentage of unrecognised browsers, previously counted as Firefox, that are now assumed to be Internet Explorer 11 fixed in the February 2014 and later numbers. And February 2014 numbers include mobile for Internet Explorer and Firefox (not included in Android). Chrome did not include the mobile numbers at that time while Android does since there was an "Android browser" that was the default browser at that time.

Clicky (September 2009 to August 2013)

StatOwl.com (September 2008 to November 2012) 

92% of sites monitored by StatOwl serve predominantly United States market.

AT Internet Institute (Europe, July 2007 to June 2010) 
AT Internet Institute was formerly known as XiTi.

Method: Only counts visits to local sites in 23 European countries and then averages the percentages for those 23 European countries independent of population size.

TheCounter.com (2000 to 2009) 
TheCounter.com is a defunct a web counter service, and identifies sixteen versions of six browsers (Internet Explorer, Firefox, Safari, Opera, Netscape, and Konqueror). Other browsers are categorised as either "Netscape compatible" (including Google Chrome, which may also be categorized as "Safari" because of its "Webkit" subtag) or "unknown". Internet Explorer 8 is identified as Internet Explorer 7. Monthly data includes all hits from 2008-02-01 until the end of the month concerned. More than the exact browser type, this data identifies the underlying rendering engine used by various browsers, and the table below aggregates them in the same column.

OneStat.com (April 2002 to March 2009)

ADTECH (Europe, 2004 to 2009)

WebSideStory (US, February 1999 to June 2006)

Older reports (pre-2000) 

GVU WWW user survey (January 1994 to October 1998)

EWS Web Server at UIUC (1996 Q2 to 1998)

ZD Market Intelligence (US, January 1997 to January 1998)

Zona Research (US, Jan 1997 to Jan 1998)

AdKnowledge (January 1998 to June 1998)

Dataquest (1995 to 1997)

International Data Corporation (US, 1996 to 1997)

See also 
 List of web browsers
 Comparison of web browsers
 Browser wars
 Timeline of web browsers
 Market share
 Usage share of operating systems
 Usage share of BitTorrent clients
 Usage share of Instant Messaging clients

References

External links 
 Useragent Detection
 Online parser for Useragent

Web browsers